Baldern Castle ( or Burgstelle Baldern) is a former castle in the municipality of Stallikon and the canton of Zürich in Switzerland. The earthworks are obscured by the site's woodland nature.

A legend recorded ca. 1510 suggests that the castle was built by Ludwig the German, the first king of East Francia, in the 9th century, but there is no strong evidence for this. 
The castle is known to have been owned by the Counts of Lenzburg in the 12th century. There have been no significant archeological investigations of the site, and the date and reason it was abandoned is unknown.

The site of the castle lies about  walk north of the upper station of the Adliswil-Felsenegg cable car at Felsenegg. The panoramic footpath from Uetliberg to Felsenegg passes through the old castle site.

Gallery

See also
 List of castles in Switzerland

References

Castles in the canton of Zürich